The 1966 Brisbane Rugby League season was the 58th season of the Brisbane Rugby League premiership. Eight teams from across Brisbane competed for the premiership, which culminated in minor premiers Northern Suburbs defeating Past Brothers 9-6 in the grand final, winning their seventh premiership in eight years.

Ladder

Finals

Grand Final 
Northern Suburbs 9 (Tries: Cattanach, Goals: Lobegeiger 2, Field goals: Brown)

Past Brothers 6 (Goals: Cavanagh 2, Dowling)

References 

1966 in rugby league
1966 in Australian rugby league
Rugby league in Brisbane